The 2017 Central Pulse season saw the Central Pulse netball team compete in the 2017 ANZ Premiership and the 2017 Netball New Zealand Super Club. With a team coached by Yvette McCausland-Durie, captained by Katrina Grant and featuring Cathrine Tuivaiti, Pulse finished the 2017 ANZ Premiership season as grand finalists and runners-up. In the grand final they lost 69–53 to Southern Steel. In the inaugural Netball New Zealand Super Club tournament, Pulse finished fourth.

Players

Player movements

2017 roster

Pre-season
In March 2017, Central Pulse and Netball Central hosted the official ANZ Premiership pre-season tournament at Te Wānanga o Raukawa in Ōtaki. All six teams participated in the three day tournament.   

Notes
 40 minute game, 4 x 10 minute quarters.

ANZ Premiership regular season

Fixtures and results
Round 1

Round 2

Round 3

Round 4

Round 5

Round 6

Round 7

Round 8

Round 9

Round 10

Round 11

Round 12

Round 13

Final standings

ANZ Premiership Finals Series

Elimination final

Grand final

Netball New Zealand Super Club

Group stage

1st/4th Play offs
Semi-finals

Third place play-off

National Netball League
With a team featuring Karin Burger, Rhiarna Ferris, Tiana Metuarau, Kimiora Poi and Ainsleyana Puleiata, Pulse's reserve team, Central Zone won the 2017 National Netball League title after defeating Hellers Netball Mainland 43–41 in the grand final at The Trusts Arena.

References

2017
2017 ANZ Premiership season
2017 in New Zealand netball